Jim Gillespie may refer to:

Jim Gillespie (baseball) (1894–1976), American baseball player
Jim Gillespie (director), Scottish film director
Jim Gillespie (footballer, born 1947) (1947–2016), Scottish footballer
Jim Gillespie (footballer, born 1957) (born 1957), Scottish footballer

See also
James Gillespie (disambiguation)